Joel Ricardo Ribeiro Queirós (born 21 May 1982) is a Portuguese futsal player who plays as a pivot for Modicus Sandim and formerly played for the Portugal national team.

Honours

Club
Freixieiro
 Liga Portuguesa: 2001–02
 Supertaça de Portugal: 2002

ElPozo Murcia
 Primera División: 2005–06, 2006–07
 Supercopa de España: 2006

Benfica
Liga Portuguesa: 2008–09, 2011–12
Taça de Portugal: 2011–12
Supertaça de Portugal: 2011, 2012
UEFA Futsal Cup: 2009–10

Country
Portugal
 UEFA Futsal Championship: Runner-up 2010

Individual
 UEFA Futsal Championship Golden Boot: 2010

References

External links
 
 
 

1982 births
Living people
Sportspeople from Porto
Portuguese men's futsal players
AR Freixieiro players
ElPozo Murcia FS players
Xota FS players
S.L. Benfica futsal players